Anne-Marie Irving (born 16 February 1977 in Christchurch) is a former field hockey goalkeeper from New Zealand, who finished sixth with her national team at the 2000 Summer Olympics in Sydney. She also competed with The Black Sticks at the 2002 Commonwealth Games in Manchester.

References

External links

New Zealand female field hockey players
Female field hockey goalkeepers
Olympic field hockey players of New Zealand
Field hockey players at the 2000 Summer Olympics
Field hockey players from Christchurch
1977 births
Living people
Field hockey players at the 2002 Commonwealth Games
Commonwealth Games competitors for New Zealand
20th-century New Zealand women
21st-century New Zealand women